Dereck Leonard Faulkner (born May 6, 1985) is a former professional gridiron football wide receiver. He was signed as an undrafted free agent by the Philadelphia Eagles in 2007. He played college football for the Hampton Pirates.

Faulkner has also been a member of the BC Lions.

Early years
Faulkner grew up in Moorestown, New Jersey and played high school football at Moorestown High School, where he was a First-team All-Statewide receiver. He also earned All-County, All-Conference Accolades as well as All-South Jersey Honors after catching 40 passes for 898 yards (22.5 avg) and nine touchdowns his senior season. Super Prep rated him among the top 100 players on the East Coast. He chose Hampton University over the University of Iowa.

College career
Faulkner immediately earned playing time as a true freshman at the "X" receiver position. Despite playing behind current All-Pro Kick Returner current Houston Texans Jerome Mathis, Faulkner still finished second on the team with 20 receptions for 249 yards and 1 touchdown in 10 games.
17 of those catches resulted in first downs, with 12 of those coming on third down plays. A strained calf muscle limited Faulkner to 9 games in 2005. He still contributed to the team by pulling in 24 catches for 427 yards and 3 touchdowns, finishing third on the team, showing his prowess as the team clutch third-down receiver. He helped convert 12 third-down plays finishing with a total of 22 first down receptions. He suffered a broken right fibula during practice in the fourth week of the season and only played in 13 games over his last two seasons at Hampton. He finished his career with 74 catches for 1,011 yards.

Professional career

Philadelphia Eagles
Despite not being drafted after a good career and a great work-out, Faulkner still fulfilled a childhood dream by being signed by the team he grew up cheering for, the Philadelphia Eagles, God-Father and family friend Eagle being All-Pro wide receiver Mike Quick, who also is a family friend. Quick was very positive when he heard the news about Faulkner going to the Eagles. He was quoted as saying: "It was a quick decision, but it was a strong decision." Faulkner was quoted saying:"I think this was the right decision for me. They didn't draft any wide receivers this year, and they only signed one other UDFA undrafted free agent wide receiver, so I'll have a good shot to show them I can play on the level of the receivers they have now."

British Columbia Lions
Faulkner was signed by the BC Lions on April 8, 2009.

Personal
Faulkner majored in Business Management and hopes to become a sportscaster when his playing days are over. His father was a linebacker at Virginia State University.
Dereck is a member of Omega Psi Phi fraternity (Gamma Epsilon chapter).

References

External links
BC Lions bio

1985 births
Living people
Moorestown High School alumni
People from Moorestown, New Jersey
Players of American football from New Jersey
Sportspeople from Burlington County, New Jersey
American football wide receivers
Hampton Pirates football players
Philadelphia Eagles players
BC Lions players